Satyrodes appalachia, the Appalachian brown or woods eyed brown is a species of Satyrinae butterfly that is native to North America.

Wingspan: 39 to 51 mm.

Larvae on Rhynchospora inundata, Carex lacustris, and Carex stricta.

See Lethe appalachia (Lethe = current genus name) at Wikipedia for more Satyrodes appalachia information.

Similar species
Satyrodes eurydice [Lethe eurydice] (R.L. Chermock, 1947) – eyed brown 
Enodia anthedon / Lethe anthedon   A.H. Clark, 1936 – northern pearly-eye

References

Butterflies of North America
Elymniini
Butterflies described in 1947